Tyrinna delicata is a species of sea slug or dorid nudibranch, a marine gastropod mollusk in the family Chromodorididae.

Distribution

Description
The maximum recorded body length is 68 mm.

Ecology
Minimum recorded depth is 4 m. Maximum recorded depth is 5 m.

References

External links

Chromodorididae
Gastropods described in 1877